Dumbarton (Gaelic: Dùn Breatann) is a constituency of the Scottish Parliament (Holyrood) covering parts of the council areas of Argyll and Bute and West Dunbartonshire. It elects one Member of the Scottish Parliament (MSP) by the first past the post method of election. It is also one of ten constituencies in the West Scotland electoral region, which elects seven additional members, in addition to the ten constituency MSPs, to produce a form of proportional representation for the region as a whole.

The seat has been held continuously by Jackie Baillie of Scottish Labour since being first contested at the 1999 Scottish Parliament election.

Electoral region 

The other nine constituencies of the West Scotland region are Clydebank and Milngavie, Cunninghame North, Cunninghame South, Eastwood, Greenock and Inverclyde, Paisley, Renfrewshire North and West, Renfrewshire South and Strathkelvin and Bearsden.

The region covers part of the Argyll and Bute council area, the East Dunbartonshire council area, the East Renfrewshire council area, the Inverclyde council area, North Ayrshire council area, the Renfrewshire council area and the West Dunbartonshire council area.

Constituency boundaries and council area 

The Dumbarton constituency was created at the same time as the Scottish Parliament, in 1999, with the name and boundaries of an  existing Westminster constituency. In 2005, however, the Westminster (House of Commons) constituency was abolished in favour of new constituencies.

The constituency takes in Helensburgh and Lomond from the Argyll and Bute council area and covers Dumbarton and the Vale of Leven in West Dunbartonshire. The rest of West Dunbartonshire is covered by the Clydebank and Milngavie. The rest of Argyll and Bute is covered by the Argyll and Bute constituency, which is within the Highlands and Islands electoral region.

From the 2011 Scottish Parliament election, Dumbarton had its boundaries altered to include the following electoral wards:

From West Dunbartonshire: Dumbarton, Leven, Lomond
From Argyll and Bute: Lomond North, Helensburgh Central, Helensburgh and Lomond South

Constituency profile 
Dumbarton is the only constituency in the Scottish Parliament to have voted Labour in every election in the devolved era. Ahead of the 2021 election, The Times profiled the seat:

Incumbent Jackie Baillie has cultivated a profile as a hard working local MSP, a reputation that has helped her retain the seat as the Labour Party has declined nationally. In the 2021 election there was speculation that the seat could vote SNP for the first time, but in the end, Baillie increased her majority from 109 to 1,483. The SNP candidate, Toni Giugliano, blamed his loss on pro-Union tactical voting, tweeting: "The Tory vote in Helensburgh went to Labour in extraordinary numbers to keep us out."

Member of the Scottish Parliament

Election results

2020s

2010s

2000s

1990s

Notes and references

External links

Constituencies of the Scottish Parliament
1999 establishments in Scotland
Constituencies established in 1999
Scottish Parliament constituencies and regions 1999–2011
Scottish Parliament constituencies and regions from 2011
Vale of Leven
Dumbarton
Politics of West Dunbartonshire
Politics of Argyll and Bute
Helensburgh